The 9th Congress of the Philippines (Filipino: Ikasiyam na Kongreso ng Pilipinas), composed of the Philippine Senate and House of Representatives, met from July 27, 1992, until June 9, 1995, during the first three years of Fidel Ramos's presidency. The convening of the 9th Congress follows the 1992 national elections, where, under the transitory provisions of the Constitution, the first 12 senators who garnered the highest votes would have a six-year term while the next 12 senators would have a three-year term and the entire membership of the House of Representatives was replaced.

Sessions
First Regular Session: July 27, 1992 – June 4, 1993
First Special Session: January 4 – February 26, 1993
Second Special Session: March 8 – April 16, 1993
Second Regular Session: July 26, 1993 – June 10, 1994
Third Special Session: January 3 – April 1, 1994
Third Regular Session: July 25, 1994 – June 9, 1995
Fourth Special Session: January 2 – February 24, 1995
Fifth Special Session: February 27 – March 24, 1995
Sixth Special Session: March 27 – April 7, 1995
Seventh Special Session: April 10 – May 5, 1995

Legislation
Laws passed by the 9th Congress:

Leadership

Senate
President of the Senate

Neptali A. Gonzales (LDP)
Edgardo J. Angara (LDP)
Senate President Pro-Tempore
Leticia R. Shahani (Lakas-NUCD)

Majority Floor Leader
Alberto Romulo (LDP)

Minority Floor Leader
Wigberto E. Tañada  (Liberal)

House of Representatives
Speaker of the House of Representatives
Jose C. de Venecia, Jr. (Lakas-CMD, 4th District Pangasinan)

Speaker Pro Tempore
Raul A. Daza (Liberal, 1st District Northern Samar)
Majority Floor Leader
Minority Floor Leader

Members

Composition

Senate

Notes

House of Representatives

District representatives 

Notes

Sectoral representatives

Notes

See also
Congress of the Philippines
Senate of the Philippines
House of Representatives of the Philippines
1992 Philippine general election

References

External links

Further reading
Philippine House of Representatives Congressional Library

09
Fifth Philippine Republic